De Tretten (The Group of Thirteen), also De Tretten Kunstnere (The Thirteen Artists), was a grouping of young Danish artists who arranged their own exhibitions in Copenhagen from 1909 to 1912 in order to display works which would not have been accepted for exhibition by the then rather traditional Royal Danish Academy of Fine Arts.

Background

Based on the French model of the Salon des Refusés, De Tretten was founded on the initiative of Olaf Rude (who exhibited there in 1909 and 1910) and the critic Jens Pedersen. Rude had managed to obtain financial guarantees for the enterprise from those who had recently established themselves in the seaside resort of Marielyst on Falster which had been promoted as an artists colony along the lines of Skagen. Several, including Rude himself, had studied at the Kunstnernes Frie Studieskoler under Kristian Zahrtmann who had broken away from the Academy into the developing trends of Naturalism and Realism. Paintings exhibited at De Tretten were often in line with movements of the times such as Futurism and Post-Impressionism.

Exhibiting artists

De Tretten also included:

Folmer Bonnén (1885–1960), exhibited in 1909, 1910 and 1912
Niels Peter Bolt (1886-1965), exhibited in 1909 and 1912
Anton Hansen (1891–1960), exhibited in 1910 and 1912
Harald Henriksen (1883–1960), exhibited in 1909 and 1910
Axel P. Jensen (1886–1972), exhibited in 1909 and 1910
Carl Jensen (1887–1961), exhibited in 1909 and 1910
Aksel Jørgensen (1883-1957), exhibited in 1909 and 1910
Hans Jespersen Koefoed (1884–1975), exhibited in 1912
Jais Nielsen (1885–1961), exhibited in 1909 and 1910
Storm Petersen (1882–1949), better known as Storm P., exhibited in 1909
William Scharff (1886–1959), exhibited in 1909 and 1910
Einar Utzon-Frank (1888–1955), exhibited in 1909
Edvard Weie (1879-1943), exhibited in 1909.

Similar Danish initiatives

De Tretten was not the only attempt to exhibit outside the Academy. Den Frie Udstilling (The Free Exhibition) was established in 1891 and continues to exhibit today. Grønningen, founded in 1915, now exhibits in the Charlottenborg Exhibition Hall.

References

Bibliography
Katalog over de tretten Kunstneres Udstilling, Copenhagen: Den Frie Udstillings Bygning, 1909-1912.

Danish artist groups and collectives
1909 establishments in Denmark
Arts organizations established in 1909
Art exhibitions in Denmark
Danish painters
Danish art